Frank Yusty Fabra Palacios (born 22 February 1991) is a Colombian professional footballer who plays as a left-back for Argentine Primera División club Boca Juniors and the Colombia national team.

He began his career with Envigado, debuting in 2010. He joined Deportivo Cali in 2014, where he was part of the squad that won the 2015 Apertura. After a brief spell at Independiente Medellín, Fabra signed for Boca Juniors on a three-year deal.

Fabra made his international debut for Colombia in 2015, and was part of the squads that finished third at the Copa América in 2016 and 2021.

Club career

Envigado 
Fabra is a product of Envigado's youth system. At the age of 18, he was called up to the first team and debuted on 22 July 2010 against Cúcuta Deportivo. Despite his young age, Fabra quickly made himself a first team player, earning 106 caps and scoring three goals for El Equipo Naranja after four seasons at the club.

Deportivo Cali 
In July 2014, Fabra was loaned out to fellow Colombian club Deportivo Cali for 6 months with a purchase option. During his loan spell in Cali, he was fast to install himself into the starting eleven, scoring once and earning 26 caps. The 2015 Apertura was Fabra's first big break, as he helped guide Cali to secure its ninth league. Following his first career title, Fabra was included in the Apertura's team of the season.

Independiente Medellín 
For the 2015 Clausura, Fabra signed for Independiente Medellín after being heavily requested by Leonel Álvarez, Independiente's manager at the time. Fabra did not waste time during his adaptation and was quick to form part of the team's starting eleven. on 25 July, he scored his first goal for the Paisa club in a 1–0 victory against Deportes Tolima.

Boca Juniors 
On 24 January 2016, Fabra signed a three and a half year contract with Argentine super club Boca Juniors despite heavy interest from several clubs in South America and Europe. He made his debut on 14 February in a home loss against Atlético Tucumán, having to leave the pitch after 44 minutes due to a later confirmed injury. His first goal came at the 2016 Copa Libertadores and was against his former club Deportivo Cali. The match ended in a 6–2 victory for Boca. On 12 May, Fabra scored an important away goal during the first leg of quarter-finals against Uruguayans Club Nacional. The match finished in a one-goal draw. The second leg finished with the same score, forcing a penalty shoot out between the teams. Fabra converted his penalty in a cheeky manner with some people comparing it to the way Diego Maradona often converted his own. Boca advanced to the semi-finals winning 4–3 on penalties and the series ended 2–2 on aggregate.

On 11 September 2016, Fabra scored his third goal for the Xeneizes against Belgrano in a 3–0 home triumph for match day three of the season. Fabra won the 2016–17 Argentine Primera División with Boca Juniors, making the achievement his first title with the club.

Sequentially after the end of Jonathan Silva's loan the following year, Fabra saw himself as the club's first choice left-back. For match day four of the 2017–18 season, Fabra found the net in Boca's 4–0 thrashing of Vélez Sarsfield. His second goal of the season arrived against Atlético Temperley, the sole celebration of the match.

On 3 November 2019, Fabra scored his first brace for Boca Juniors in a 5–1 route of Arsenal de Sarandí.

International career
On 28 August 2015, Fabra received his first call up from José Pékerman to Colombia's senior team to play a friendly against Peru. Fabra made his debut on 8 September, playing 90 minutes in a 1–1 draw against the Peruvians. His first official game was also against Peru, this time for the 2018 FIFA World Cup qualifiers. Colombia secured 3 points, claiming a 2–0 victory in the Estadio Metropolitano of Barranquilla.

He was included in Colombia's 23-man squad for the Copa América Centenario, tournament where Fabra scored his first international goal against Costa Rica. He appeared four times at the tournament as Colombia clinched a third-place finish.

During the later part of the 2018 World Cup qualifiers, Fabra broke into the starting eleven for the rest of the matches with Colombia eventually finishing fourth thus earning direct qualification for the 2018 World Cup in Russia.

In May 2018 Fabra was named in Colombia's squad for the 2018 FIFA World Cup in Russia. However, he was ruled out of the tournament after sustaining an anterior cruciate ligament tear in his left knee during training on 9 June 2018.

International goals
As of match played 17 November 2020. Colombia score listed first, score column indicates score after each Fabra goal.

Personal life
Fabra is married to fellow Colombian Tatiana Gómez, with whom he has a son. Since 2019, Fabra has been a citizen of Argentina.

Honours
Deportivo Cali
 Primera A: 2015 Apertura

Boca Juniors
 Argentine Primera División: 2016–17, 2017–18, 2019–20, 2022
 Copa Argentina: 2019–20
 Copa de la Liga Profesional: 2020, 2022 
 Supercopa Argentina: 2018, 2022

References

External links

1991 births
Living people
Colombian footballers
Colombian expatriate footballers
Envigado F.C. players
Deportivo Cali footballers
Independiente Medellín footballers
Boca Juniors footballers
Categoría Primera A players
Argentine Primera División players
Association football defenders
Colombia international footballers
Copa América Centenario players
2021 Copa América players
Expatriate footballers in Argentina
Colombian expatriate sportspeople in Argentina
Colombian people of African descent
Naturalized citizens of Argentina
Sportspeople from Antioquia Department